Dimmelsvik is a village in Kvinnherad municipality in Vestland county, Norway.

The village is an old trading post going back for hundreds of years.  The village was the administrative centre of Kninnherad municipality until just after World War II, when the administration was moved to the nearby village of Rosendal.  The village has a barrel factory and a clog factory.  NorStone also has a gravel and sand pit in the Dimmelsvik area.  The company is a large supplier of gravel, sand, and crushed stone.

References

Villages in Vestland
Kvinnherad